Ithaca was, in Greek mythology, the island home of the hero Odysseus. The specific location of the island, as it was described in Homer's Odyssey, is a matter for debate. There have been various theories about its location. Modern Ithaca has traditionally been accepted to be Homer's island. One recent alternative candidate is Paliki, which may have been an island separated from the rest of Kefalonia, as argued by Bittlestone, Diggle and Underhill in Odysseus Unbound. This theory, however, has not been generally accepted on grounds of geology, archaeology, philology, or historical and Homeric analysis. “What is clearly missing,” wrote Dr Christine Haywood reviewing Odysseus Unbound, “is a good knowledge of the complexities of Homeric language, and the support of archaeology.”

The central characters of the epic such as Odysseus, Achilles, Agamemnon and Hector are sometimes believed to be fictional characters. Yet there are many claims that some Homeric hero long ago had inhabited a particular contemporary region or village. This, and the extremely detailed geographic descriptions in the epic itself, have invited investigation of the possibility that Homer's heroes might have existed and that the location of the sites described therein might be found.

Heinrich Schliemann believed he tracked down several of the more famous traditions surrounding these heroes. Many locations around the Mediterranean were claimed to have been the heroes' "homes", such as the ruins at Mycenae and the little hill near the western Turkish town of Hissarlik. Schliemann's work and excavations proposed, to a very sceptical world, that Homer's Agamemnon had lived at Mycenae, and that "Troy" itself indeed had existed at Hisarlik. Much work has been done to identify other Homeric sites such as the palace of Nestor at Pylos. These attempts have been the subject of much scholarly research, archaeological work, and controversy.

Theories on the location of "Homer's 'Ithaca'" were formulated as early as the 2nd century BC to as recently as AD 2005. Each approach to identifying a location has been different, varying in degrees of scientific procedure, empirical investigation, informed hypothesis, wishful thinking, fervent belief, and sheer fantasy. Each investigator and each investigation merits interest, as an indicator both of the temper of the times in which a particular theory was developed, and of the perennial interest in Odysseus and the possible facts of his life. Some of the latest "Homer's 'Ithaca'" approaches resemble some of the earliest.

Leading precursors 
Theorists, and excavations elsewhere, on the location of "Homer's 'Ithaca'"

 Eratosthenes (276 BC – 194 BC).
 Demetrius of Scepsis (near Troy) -- writing mid-2nd century BC (near Troy) -- source used by Strabo (below).
. See Bittlestone/Diggle/Underhill (below): James Diggle at p. 508.
 Apollodorus of Athens (born c. 180 BC) -- writing mid-2nd century BC—source used by Strabo (below), and Apollodorus also relied upon Demetrius of Scepsis (above).
 244, F 154-207.
. See Bittlestone/Diggle/Underhill (below): James Diggle at p. 508.
 Strabo (63/4 BC – c. 24 AD).

 William Gell—writing in 1807—he believed Homer's "Ithaca" was on the Aetos isthmus of Ithaki island, facing east, in or near the bay of Vathy.

 William M. Leake—writing in 1835—he thought "Ithaca" was on the northwestern coast of Ithaki island, near Polis Bay.

Théophile Cailleux—writing in 1878—located "Ithaca" in south-west Spain, in the delta of the Guadalete, near Cádiz. 

 Samuel Butler developed a controversial theory that the Odyssey came from the pen of a young Sicilian woman, who presents herself in the poem as Nausicaa, and that the scenes of the poem reflected the coast of Sicily, especially the territory of Trapani and its nearby islands. He described the "evidence" for this theory in his The Authoress of the Odyssey (1897) and in the introduction and footnotes to his prose translation of the Odyssey (1900). Robert Graves elaborated on this hypothesis in his novel Homer's Daughter.
 Wilhelm Dörpfeld (December 26, 1853 – April 25, 1940) -- having performed extensive excavations at various locations of Ithaca and Lefkada, he proposed that the palace of Odysseus was located west of Nidri at the south coast of Lefkada. 

 G. Volterras—writing in 1903—he believed Paliki once may have had "Strabo's channel" at the isthmus which now separates Paliki and Kefalonia (see Bittlestone/Diggle/Underhill, below).

 A.E.H. Goekoop—writing in 1908—he believed "Ithaca" was in southwestern Kefalonia island, on the St. George hilltop near Mazarakata village, southeast of the city of Argostoli, with its harbor at Minies near the modern airport.

 Lord Rennell of Rodd—writing in 1927—believed "Ithaca" was on Ithaki island.

 W.A. Heurtley and Sylvia Benton—believed "Ithaca" was on Ithaki island, and their excavations at the Polis Bay harbor turned up 8th- to 9th-century BC artifacts.
 C.H. Goekoop—writing in 1990, grandson of A.E.H. Goekoop—he thought "Ithaca" was on Kefalonia, but in the northern Erissos region, near the town of Fiscardo.

 E.S. Tsimaratos—published posthumously in 1998—he thought "Ithaca" was in central Kefalonia, but he agreed with Strabo about Paliki once having been cut off from Kefalonia.

 J.V. Luce (1920-2011), writing in 1998, believed "Ithaca" was on Ithaki island.

 Nicolas G. Livadas (Author), Constantine Bisticas (Editor, Translator)

 Henriette Putman Cramer, Gerasimos Metaxas - the authors believe that the centre of Homeric Ithaca was in south-east Kefalonia where now the village of Poros in the Eleios-Pronnoi municipality is situated. 
 
 Gilles Le Noan — writing in 1989-2005 — suggested Paliki as the location of "Ithaca", but discounted the geology supporting "Strabo's channel".

 Christos Tzakos — writing 1999-2005 — believed "Ithaca" was on Ithaki island.
 
 

 
 Robert Bittlestone, James Diggle & John Underhill — first working in 2003 — believe Paliki is the location of "Ithaca", and also believe in "Strabo's Channel" separated it from Cephalonia, see Odysseus Unbound.
  Odysseus Unbound website
 Athenagoras Eleutheriuo argued that Paxos was Homeric Ithaca
 
 Dimitris I. Paizis-Danias published ten maps of Cephallenian theories and argued that Homer's Ithaca was on Ithaki
 
Felice Vinci suggests that many Homeric places can be identified in the geographic landscape of the Baltic.

 Manolis Koutlis - placed Ithaca on Faial in the Azores.

 Jonathan Brown - located Ithaca on Ithaki after travelling to Cephalonia, Lefkada, Corfu, Sicily, Spain, Denmark, and the Azores to examine other theories.
 National Library of Australia, Trove

See also 
 Geography of the Odyssey
 Historicity of the Homeric epics
 Trojan War
 Where Troy Once Stood

References 
 Bittlestone, Diggle & Underhill (2005), cited above, Chapter 9 generally.
 Several of the floruit dates above are taken from Wikipedia articles about the writers.

External links 
www.friendsofhomer.gr
Odysseus Unbound website; Odysseus Unbound discussion forum
Collection of Homer-related links
Homer's Odyssey resources on the Web, by Jorn Barger
Wake of Odysseus, on localization by Jonathan Burgess
The Perseus Digital Library, Tufts University
Perseus at Tufts, Greek & Roman materials
Perseus at Tufts, a search on "homer*", which currently reaches 77 results, including "homeric": Art objects (1), Images (8), Reference articles (6), Text sections (19), Source citations (30), Texts (13)

Geography of the Odyssey

Locations in Greek mythology
History of the Ionian Islands
Homeric scholarship